The 2019 Asia Rugby Women's Sevens Olympic Qualifying Tournament was held on 9–10 November at Guangzhou Higher Education Mega Center Central Stadium in Guangzhou. Japan, as host, prequalified for the Olympic Games, and did not take part in this competition. The champion of the tournament, hosts China, qualify for the Asian continental berth in the 2020 Summer Olympics. The second and third-placed teams, Hong Kong and Kazakhstan, qualify to take part in a 2020 Olympic repechage tournament for one of two final berths in Tokyo.

Teams

Pool stage
All times in China Standard Time (UTC+08:00)

Pool A

Pool B

Knockout round

Plate

Cup

References

Europe
Asia
2019 in women's rugby union
International rugby union competitions hosted by China
Asia Rugby